Jean-Louis Schlesser (born 12 September 1948) is a French racing driver with experience in circuit racing and cross-country rallying. He is known for his wins of many different competitions. He is the nephew of Jo Schlesser, a former Formula One driver. Jean-Louis attempted two Formula One races five years apart and his best known for his involvement in the 1988 Italian Grand Prix.

Early career
Schlesser grew up in Morocco before returning to France to study and to complete military service. He began racing in the early 1970s after enrolling at the racing school at Le Mans, starting with numerous rally events. In 1976, he entered Formula Three, alternating between the French and European series for the next six years, and sharing the 1978 French championship with Alain Prost. In 1977 he began racing sports cars, and in 1981 he attempted the Le Mans 24 Hours for the first time, placing second with Philippe Streiff and Jacky Haran. He also began racing touring cars in 1980, competing in the French Supertouring Championship. In 1982, he moved from Formula Three to Formula Two, but it was not a success. Nonetheless, he moved into Formula One in 1983, while continuing to race sports cars and touring cars.

Formula One
Schlesser was working as a test driver for Williams when he gained his first taste of Formula One (F1) in early 1983 when he bought a drive in the RAM team's March-RAM 01-Cosworth. His first race was the non-championship Race of Champions at Brands Hatch, where he started last of the 13 entrants and finished 6th. One week later, at the French Grand Prix at Paul Ricard, he was the slowest of the 29 cars in qualifying and thus failed to make the grid. He did not take part in another F1 race for five years, though he continued to test for Williams, and was active in sports car racing.

1988 Italian Grand Prix
In 1988, Williams called upon Schlesser to deputise for an unwell Nigel Mansell at the Italian Grand Prix at Monza. With 26 of the 31 cars allowed to start, Schlesser qualified 22nd, and thus made his Grand Prix début the day before his 40th birthday.

In the race, Schlesser worked his way up to 11th, while Ayrton Senna led from pole position in his McLaren. In the closing stages, the Ferraris of Gerhard Berger and Michele Alboreto started to catch Senna, and were only a few seconds behind at the start of lap 49, three laps from race end. At that point, Senna came up to lap Schlesser for the second time. Going into the tight Rettifilo chicane at the end of the start-finish straight, Schlesser went wide, expecting the Brazilian driver to pass on the inside, and in the process locked his brakes. Wishing to keep his car on the track, Schlesser turned inside, and his left front wheel hit Senna's right rear. With the rear suspension broken, the McLaren spun and beached itself on a kerb, and the Ferraris secured a one-two finish on home soil, less than a month after Enzo Ferrari's death. The collision also prevented the McLaren team from winning all 16 races of the 1988 season.

Afterwards, Schlesser said that he did not think the collision was his fault. Nonetheless, he made a tearful apology to Senna.

Twenty-five years later, at the 2013 Monaco Grand Prix, McLaren chairman Ron Dennis was reintroduced to Schlesser. Dennis said, "This is the man who ruined my life and our perfect record back in 1988.”  Schlesser responded saying that "what happened that day at Monza kept you hungry..."

Touring car and sports car racing
The mid-1980s saw Schlesser perform in touring cars and sports cars, winning the French Touring Car Championship in 1985 with a TWR Rover Vitesse, as well as driving the works TWR Jaguars in the World Sportscar Championship. In 1986 he raced in the British Touring Car Championship, again in a TWR Rover Vitesse.

In 1988, he joined the Sauber-Mercedes squad full-time, winning the German Supercup and finishing the World Sportscar Championship in second place, (behind Martin Brundle). before winning the WSC title in 1989 and 1990, on this occasion sharing the title with co-driver Mauro Baldi. His last season in WSC was 1991 during which he raced alongside Michael Schumacher with Sauber-Mercedes. He also won the "Classic Masters" title at the 1994 Race of Champions.

Off-road racing

After a first outing in 1984, Schlesser began to compete regularly in the Paris-Dakar Rally in 1989. In 1992 he began to build his own dune buggies to compete in the Dakar and other desert marathons and European bajas. His first buggy, the Porsche-powered Schlesser Original, debuted in 1992 in the Baja Portugal 1000, which Schlesser won outright, beating the works Citroën cars with a two-wheel drive vehicle and without a navigator by his side.

He went on to several 2WD class and overall wins the following years, before taking the overall victory in the 1999 and 2000 editions of the Dakar (respectively, Granada-Dakar and Paris-Dakar-Cairo). In the 2001 Dakar he was near victory but penalised one hour for unsportsmanlike conduct after illegally blocking his closest competitor both at the start and during the penultimate stage. He also won the FIA Cross Country Rally World Cup from 1998 to 2002 and the 2 WD FIA Cross Country Rally World Cup several times. Schlesser won every edition of the Africa Eco Race from its establishment in 2009 to 2014.

Racing record

Complete World Sportscar Championship results
(key) (Races in bold indicate pole position; races in italics indicate fastest lap)

Footnotes

Complete 24 Hours of Le Mans results

Complete European Formula Two Championship results
(key) (Races in bold indicate pole position; races in italics indicate fastest lap)

Complete Formula One World Championship results
(key)

Complete British Saloon Car Championship results
(key) (Races in bold indicate pole position – 1973–1990 in class) (Races in italics indicate fastest lap – 1 point awarded ?–1989 in class)

Complete Deutsche Tourenwagen Meisterschaft results
(key)

Filmography
 Taxi 2 (2000)

See also
Buggy Schlesser

References

External links

Jean-Louis Schlesser Official website
Africa Race Official website
Interview with Schlesser

1948 births
Living people
Sportspeople from Nancy, France
French rally drivers
French racing drivers
French Formula One drivers
Williams Formula One drivers
RAM Racing Formula One drivers
European Formula Two Championship drivers
French Formula Three Championship drivers
FIA European Formula 3 Championship drivers
British Touring Car Championship drivers
Off-road racing drivers
24 Hours of Le Mans drivers
World Touring Car Championship drivers
Dakar Rally drivers
Dakar Rally winning drivers
World Sportscar Championship drivers
24 Hours of Spa drivers
Mercedes-AMG Motorsport drivers
Jaguar Racing drivers
David Price Racing drivers
Team Joest drivers
Sauber Motorsport drivers